David Stanley Smith (July 6, 1877, Toledo, Ohio - December 17, 1949, New Haven, Connecticut) was an American composer.

Smith started his studies with Horatio Parker in 1895 at Yale University, where his friends included Charles Ives, and was appointed organist at the Center Church in New Haven.  He traveled to Europe, and became the pupil of Ludwig Thuille in Munich and Vincent d'Indy in Paris.  He returned to the United States in 1902.

On his return to New Haven in 1903, he taught music theory at Yale and succeeded Parker as the Dean of the School of Music, as well as the conductor of the New Haven Symphony Orchestra.  Smith retired from Yale in 1946.

His compositions include: one opera, Merrymount; five symphonies (the last his opus 99, published in 1947); rhapsodies and impressions for orchestra; chamber music (including ten string quartets); choral music; anthems; songs; two violin concertos; and song cycles. He was a member of Phi Mu Alpha Sinfonia fraternity.

References

External links
 The David Stanley Smith Papers at the Irving S. Gilmore Music Library, Yale University
 
 

1877 births
1949 deaths
American male classical composers
American classical composers
American opera composers
Male opera composers
American classical organists
American male organists
Yale University alumni
Yale University faculty
Musicians from Toledo, Ohio
Pupils of Horatio Parker
Classical musicians from Ohio
Male classical organists